Uffe Schultz Larsen (2 June 1921 – 29 November 2005) was a Danish sport shooter who won a silver medal in the 50 m rifle prone position at the 1952 World Championships. He competed in various events at the 1948, 1952, 1956 and 1960 Summer Olympics with the best result of 13th place. His father Niels Larsen and grandfather Hans Schultz were also Olympic rifle shooters.

References

External Links

1921 births
2005 deaths
People from Nordfyn Municipality
Danish male sport shooters
ISSF rifle shooters
Olympic shooters of Denmark
Shooters at the 1948 Summer Olympics
Shooters at the 1952 Summer Olympics
Shooters at the 1956 Summer Olympics
Shooters at the 1960 Summer Olympics
Sportspeople from the Region of Southern Denmark